Booragoon is a southern suburb of Perth, Western Australia, located within the City of Melville.

Booragoon is the indigenous name for the lower reaches of the Canning River.

It is home to Westfield Booragoon (formerly the Garden City Shopping Centre) and the council offices for the City of Melville. Transport is provided by the nearby Booragoon bus station.

References

External links

Suburbs of Perth, Western Australia
Suburbs in the City of Melville